Imbricariopsis punctata, common name the bone-like mitre, is a species of sea snail, a marine gastropod mollusk in the family Mitridae, the miters or miter snails.

Description
The length of the shell varies between 11 mm and 25 mm.

Distribution
This marine species occurs in the Indian Ocean off the Mascarenes, Aldabra and Réunion; also off New Guinea

References

 Poppe G.T. & Tagaro S.P. (2008). Mitridae. pp. 330–417, in: G.T. Poppe (ed.), Philippine marine mollusks, volume 2. Hackenheim: ConchBooks. 848 pp

External links
 
 Swainson, W. (1820-1823). Zoological Illustrations, or, original figures and descriptions of new, rare, or interesting animals, selected chiefly from the classes of ornithology, entomology, and conchology, and arranged on the principles of Cuvier and other modern zoologists. London: Baldwin, Cradock & Joe; Strand: W. Wood. (Vol. 1-3): pl. 1-18 [1820 pl. 19-83 [1821] pl. 84-134 [1822] pl. 135-182]
 Fedosov A., Puillandre N., Herrmann M., Kantor Yu., Oliverio M., Dgebuadze P., Modica M.V. & Bouchet P. (2018). The collapse of Mitra: molecular systematics and morphology of the Mitridae (Gastropoda: Neogastropoda). Zoological Journal of the Linnean Society. 183(2): 253-337
 Gastropods.com: Imbricariopsis punctata

Mitridae
Gastropods described in 1821